Dimapur I Assembly constituency is one of the 60 Legislative Assembly constituencies of Nagaland state in India. It is part of Dimapur District and is part of Nagaland Lok Sabha constituency.

Members of Legislative Assembly

Election results

2023

2018

2013

2008

See also
List of constituencies of the Nagaland Legislative Assembly
Dimapur district
 Dimapur
 Nagaland (Lok Sabha constituency)

References

Dimapur
Assembly constituencies of Nagaland